Taylortown is a town in Moore County, North Carolina, United States. The population was 722 as of the 2010 census. It is bordered by nearby Pinehurst.

Geography
Taylortown is located at  (35.216254, -79.495543).

Demographics

As of the census of 2000, there were 956 people, 308 households, and 226 families residing in the town. The population density was 702.4 people per square mile (271.9/km). There were 337 housing units at an average density of 280.1 per square mile (108.4/km). The racial makeup of the town was 27.46% White, 69.47% African American, 0.47% Native American, 0.24% Asian, 0.36% from other races, and 2.01% from two or more races. Hispanic or Latino of any race were 0.47% of the population.

There were 308 households, out of which 36.0% had children under the age of 18 living with them, 46.1% were married couples living together, 21.1% had a female householder with no husband present, and 26.3% were non-families. 21.4% of all households were made up of individuals, and 10.1% had someone living alone who was 65 years of age or older. The average household size was 2.74 and the average family size was 3.19.

In the town, the population was spread out, with 28.3% under the age of 18, 6.7% from 18 to 24, 32.0% from 25 to 44, 20.6% from 45 to 64, and 12.4% who were 65 years of age or older. The median age was 35 years. For every 100 females, there were 91.6 males. For every 100 females age 18 and over, there were 87.6 males.

The median income for a household in the town was $30,781, and the median income for a family was $35,739. Males had a median income of $32,625 versus $20,125 for females. The per capita income for the town was $16,889. About 12.0% of families and 14.8% of the population were below the poverty line, including 14.3% of those under age 18 and 20.7% of those age 65 or over.

References

External links
 Taylortown Police Department
 Moore County Chamber of Commerce

Towns in North Carolina
Towns in Moore County, North Carolina